"Lolly" is a song by American recording artist and record producer Maejor Ali (also known as Bei Maejor). The song, released as a single on September 17, 2013, features vocals from American rapper Juicy J and Canadian singer Justin Bieber. The song peaked 19 on the US Billboard Hot 100 chart. This is the first commercial song in which Justin Bieber raps.

Music video
The music video, directed by Matt Alonzo, shows Maejor Ali and Justin Bieber performing in a neon studio full of enthusiastic dancers and lollipop lickers. Juicy J is also featured in the video.

Track listing

Chart performance

Certifications

References

2013 singles
2013 songs
Maejor songs
Juicy J songs
Justin Bieber songs
Gangsta rap songs
Song recordings produced by Maejor
Songs written by Maejor
Songs written by Juicy J
Songs written by Chef Tone
Dirty rap songs
Songs written by Justin Bieber
Songs written by Meek Mill
Songs written by Brandon Bell (record producer)